To send someone to Coventry is an idiom used in England meaning to deliberately ostracise someone. Typically, this is done by not talking to them, avoiding their company, and acting as if they no longer exist. In essence, and by modern parlance, to ‘blank’ someone.   Coventry is a cathedral city historically in Warwickshire.

Origin
The origins of this phrase are unknown, although it is quite probable that events in Coventry in the English Civil War in the 1640s play a part. One hypothesis as to its origin is based upon The History of the Rebellion and Civil Wars in England, by Edward Hyde, 1st Earl of Clarendon. In this work, Clarendon recalls how Royalist troops that were captured in Birmingham were taken as prisoners to Coventry, which was a Parliamentarian stronghold. These troops were often not received warmly by the locals.

A book entitled Lives of the Most Remarkable Criminals (1735) states that Charles II passed an act  "whereby any person with malice aforethought by lying in wait unlawfully cutting out or disabling the tongue, putting out an eye, slitting the nose or cutting off the nose or lip of any subject of His Majesty ... shall suffer death." This was called the Coventry Act, after Sir John Coventry MP, who had "had his nose slit to the bone" by attackers.  

Some have suggested that the idiom derives from the ostracism that became a fate of Coventry's legendary "Peeping Tom". However it is surprising that there is no recorded use between the 1050s (the origin of the tale) and the first possible example suggested by the Oxford English Dictionary, dated 1647. Furthermore, there is no support for this derivation in Brewer's Dictionary of Phrase and Fable (1981),  the Oxford English Dictionary (1986), or Partridge's Dictionary of Slang and Unconventional English (1961).

An early example of the idiom is from the Club book of the Tarporley Hunt (1765):

Mr. John Barry having sent the Fox Hounds to a different place to what was ordered was sent to Coventry, but return'd upon giving six bottles of Claret to the Hunt.

By 1811, the meaning of the term was defined in Grose's The Dictionary of the Vulgar Tongue:

To send one to Coventry; a punishment inflicted by officers of the army on such of their brethren as are testy, or have been guilty of improper behaviour, not worthy the cognizance of a court martial. The person sent to Coventry is considered as absent; no one must speak to or answer any question he asks, except relative to duty, under penalty of being also sent to the same place. On a proper submission, the penitent is recalled, and welcomed by the mess, as just returned from a journey to Coventry.

According to William Clark in Tales of the Wars (1836), the phrase originates from a story about a regiment that was stationed in the city of Coventry but was ill-received and denied services.

See also 
 Boycott
 Coventry (short story) by Robert A. Heinlein
 Ghosting (behavior)
 Ostracism
 Silent treatment
 Stealth banning

References

External links
 World Wide Words - Send To Coventry

British English idioms
Coventry
Shunning
Interpersonal conflict